Christ Church is a historic church building belonging to Rouse Hill Anglican Church of the Anglican Diocese of Sydney located on Windsor Road, Rouse Hill, in the north-west of Sydney, New South Wales, Australia.

Christ Church was built in 1863 and is one of the oldest surviving buildings in Rouse Hill.

History
The land for the church, ¾ acre in total, was donated by Robert Fitzgerald to the Bishop of Sydney in 1863.

A summary of the history of Christ Church and its buildings, as recorded by Warren et al. (2006) follows:

 1863:	Land gifted to the Bishop of Sydney
 1863:	Christ Church built for the sum of 603 pounds 3 shillings
 1863-1869: Christ Church building used as both a church and school
 1869:	A separate school building was built on the same parcel of land
 1875: School changed from a denominational school to a public school
 1878:	Christ Church consecrated
 1888: School closed and pupils transferred to new Rouse Hill Public School
 1908:	School building demolished and replaced by a hall (still standing)
 1963:	School master's residence demolished
 early 1980s:	Church closed
 1998:	Church re-opened as a home for the congregation from St. Stephens, Kellyville
 2004: Church closed when a new building for St. Stephens was completed in Kellyville
 2006:	Development Application lodged with council to redevelop the site
 2008:	Church re-opened as home to the new Rouse Hill Anglican Church congregation

In recent years, the site has once more become active with construction commencing in 2007 on a new Ministry and Education Centre to be built alongside Christ Church.  As part of this project, restoration works were undertaken to Christ Church and the 1908 hall. In March 2008, Rouse Hill Anglican Church moved back to the site from their temporary home at Rouse Hill Anglican College.  The Ministry and Education Centre was officially opened on 27 April 2008 by the then Archbishop of Sydney, Dr Peter Jensen.

Current ministry
The current rector is the Rev. Graeme Howells. The church has two services each Sunday.

See also 

 Australian non-residential architectural styles
 List of Anglican churches in the Diocese of Sydney

References

External links
Rouse Hill Anglican Church home page

Anglican church buildings in Sydney
Anglican Diocese of Sydney